The Fosters Point Formation is a Cambrian limestone geologic formation in Nova Scotia and Newfoundland. It preserves fossils.

See also

 List of fossiliferous stratigraphic units in Nova Scotia
 List of fossiliferous stratigraphic units in Newfoundland and Labrador

References

 

Cambrian Nova Scotia
Cambrian south paleopolar deposits